The Conmhaícne Mheáin Maigh or Conmaicne Mhein or Conmaicne Máenmaige or Conmaicne Críche Meic Erca (the Conmaicne of the central plain), were an early people of Ireland, their tuath comprising the barony of Loughrea, in County Galway.

Origin
The Conmhaícne or Conmaicne were a people of early Ireland, perhaps related to the Laigin, who dispersed to various parts of Ireland. They settled in Connacht and Longford, giving their name to several Conmaicne territories.  O'Donovan stated "Meán/Mheáin" or "meádhan" refer to "middle or center". Maigh is Irish for "plain". The tuath is sometimes called "Conmhaícne Máenmaige", "Máenmag", "Machaire Maenmuighe", and "Tricha Máenmaige" in the Irish Annals.

Territory

An extent dated 1333 lists their territory as including the parishes of Kilconierin, Kiltullagh, Killimordaly, Grange, Killeenadeema, Lickerrig and Loughrea (the later including the parishes of Kilconickny, Kilteskill and Kilcooly). Still more were Killaan, Bullaun, Kilreekil and Kilmeen. In Anglo-Norman times it was termed a cantred. The tuath was situated near the former parish of Kilconickny - "church of the Conmaicne".

Taoiseach
It was first under the control of Ui Fhiachrach Fionn, and later by the Uí Maine. Uí Nechtain (Naughton) and Uí Máelalaid (Mullally, Lally) were listed as its ruling families.

Notable natives

In 581, the Annals of the Four Masters records the death of "Aedh mac Suibhne, toiseach Maonmuighe"/"Aedh, son of Suibhne, chief of Maenmagh". In 801, the Annals of Ulster records the deaths of Cathrannach mac Cathal of Maenmag, and the anchorite Ninnid. In 803, there was A skirmish between the Soghain and the sept of Maenmag, in which many were slain.

Neide mac Onchu mac Finnlugh was described as the Cú Chulainn of the Conmaicne in an account of the battle of Ardrahan, which took place sometime about 800.

Fearghal mac Catharnach, Lord of Loch Riach, died 821/823.

Cétadach, 31st Abbot of Clonmacnoise (died 848), was a native of Máenmaige.

Cormac mac Ceithearnach, ruler and cleric, died 881.

Conchobar Maenmaige Ua Cellaigh, King of Uí Maine (died 1180) and his foster-son, Conchobar Maenmaige Ua Conchobair, King of Connacht (1186-1189) both spent their childhood in Máenmaige.

Seán Ó Maolalaidh (fl. 1419–1480) was Chief of the Name and the last Ó Maolalaidh chief to reside in the area.

Annalistic references

From the Chronicon Scotorum:

 1132 A raid by Conchobor ua Briain into Maenmagh and he plundered Cell Biain and brought away many cows.
 1135 A Battle at Maengach initiated by the Síl Muiredaigh on the Uí Maine, in which many fell including Conchobor ua Cellaigh and ua Mainnín, king of Sogain. The Ui Maine were victorious.

From the Annals of Loch Ce:
 1180 The battle of the Conchobars, in Connacht, in which Conchobhar Maenmaighe killed Conchobhar O'Ceallaigh, i.e. the king of Uí-Maine, and his son Tadhg, and Diarmaid O'Ceallaigh, and many nobles of Uí-Maine; at Maghsruibhe-gealain,  at the head of Daire-na-capall, this battle was fought.
 1531 Tuathal, the son of O Domnallain of Machaire Maenmuighe, died. Gilla Patraic son of Adam Mac an Baird died.

See also

 Ui Fiachrach Finn
 Clann Fhergail
 Uí Fiachrach Aidhne
 Clann Taidg
 Conmhaícne Mara
 Delbhna Tir Dha Locha
 Muintir Murchada
 Senchineoil
 Soghain
 Uí Díarmata
 Síol Anmchadha
 Iar Connacht
 Maigh Seola
 Cenél Áeda na hEchtge

References

 Medieval Ireland: Territorial, Political and Economic Divisions, Paul MacCotter, Four Courts Press, 2008, pp. 140–141.

Secondary sources

  A Chorographical Description of West or H-Iar Connaught written A.D. 1684 by Roderic O'Flaherty ESQ with notes and Illustrations by, James Hardiman M.R.I.A., Irish Archaeological Society, 1846.

History of County Galway
Connacht
Geography of County Galway
Kingdoms of medieval Ireland
Conmaicne Mhein Maigh